Autarotis euryala is a moth in the family Crambidae. It was described by Edward Meyrick in 1886. It is found on Fiji.

References

Crambinae
Moths described in 1886
Moths of Fiji
Taxa named by Edward Meyrick